The Matteo Pellicone Ranking Series 2022 was a wrestling event held in Ostia, Rome, Italy between 22 and 25 of June 2022. The third United World Wrestling Ranking Series event of the year, it featured multiple World and Olympic Champions, Pan-American Champions, European Champions, Asian Champions and NCAA Champions.

The United World Wrestling postponed the Matteo Pellicone. Despite the efforts of the Italian Wrestling Federation to host Rome's Matteo Pellicone on the previously scheduled dates of February 4–7, the latest restrictions due to the Omicron variant proved to be a roadblock in hosting the event. The tournament will now be held June 22–25 in Rome, Italy preceding the 2022 European Juniors Wrestling Championships, which begin June 27 at the Pala Pellicone.

Competition schedule
All times are (UTC+2)

Medal table

Team ranking

Medal overview

Men's freestyle

Men's Greco-Roman

Women's freestyle

Participating nations 
270 wrestlers from 31 countries:

  (3)
  (28)
  (7)
  (4)
  (1)
  (4)
  (3)
  (2)
  (5)
  (20)
  (10)
  (2)
  (17)
  (1)
  (7)
  (17) (Host)
  (2)
  (7)
  (11)
  (2)
  (6)
  (13)
  (1)
  (15)
  (1)
  (3)
  (6)
  (6)
  (27)
  (24)
  (15)

Results

Men's freestyle

Men's freestyle 57 kg
 Legend
 F — Won by fall
WO — Won by walkover

Men's freestyle 61 kg
 Legend
 F — Won by fall

Men's freestyle 65 kg
 Legend
 F — Won by fall
 R — Retired

Men's freestyle 70 kg
 Legend
 F — Won by fall
WO — Won by walkover

Men's freestyle 74 kg
 Legend
 F — Won by fall
WO — Won by walkover

Men's freestyle 79 kg
 Legend
 F — Won by fall

Men's freestyle 86 kg
 Legend
 F — Won by fall
WO — Won by walkover

Men's freestyle 92 kg
24 June

Men's freestyle 97 kg
 Legend
 F — Won by fall
WO — Won by walkover

Men's freestyle 125 kg
 Legend
 F — Won by fall
 R — Retired
WO — Won by walkover

Men's Greco-Roman

Men's Greco-Roman 55 kg
22 June

Men's Greco-Roman 60 kg
22 June

Men's Greco-Roman 63 kg
22 June

Men's Greco-Roman 67 kg
 Legend
 F — Won by fall

Men's Greco-Roman 72 kg
 Legend
 F — Won by fall

Men's Greco-Roman 77 kg
 Legend
 F — Won by fall

Men's Greco-Roman 82 kg
 Legend
 F — Won by fall
C — Won by 3 cautions given to the opponent

Men's Greco-Roman 87 kg
 Legend
 F — Won by fall

Men's Greco-Roman 97 kg
 Legend
 F — Won by fall

Final

Top half

Bottom half

Men's Greco-Roman 130 kg
 Legend
 F — Won by fall

Women's freestyle

Women's freestyle 50 kg
 Legend
 F — Won by fall
WO — Won by walkover
24 June

Women's freestyle 53 kg
 Legend
 F — Won by fall
24 June

Women's freestyle 55 kg
 Legend
 F — Won by fall
WO — Won by walkover
24 June

Women's freestyle 57 kg
 Legend
 F — Won by fall

Women's freestyle 59 kg
 Legend
 F — Won by fall
WO — Won by walkover

Women's freestyle 62 kg
23 June

Women's freestyle 65 kg
24 June

Women's freestyle 68 kg
 Legend
 F — Won by fall

Women's freestyle 72 kg
24 June

Women's freestyle 76 kg
23 June

Ranking Series
Ranking Series Calendar 2022:
 1st Ranking Series: 24–27 February, Turkey, Istanbul ⇒ 2022 Yasar Dogu Tournament2022 Vehbi Emre & Hamit Kaplan Tournament
 2nd Ranking Series: 2–5 June, Kazakhstan, Almaty ⇒ 2022 Bolat Turlykhanov Cup
 3rd Ranking Series: 22–25 June, Italy, Rome ⇒ Matteo Pellicone Ranking Series 2022
 4th Ranking Series: 14–17 July, Tunisia, Tunis ⇒ 2022 Tunis Ranking Series

References

External links 
 Database

2022 in sport wrestling
2022 in Italian sport
International wrestling competitions hosted by Italy
Sport in Rome
Wrestling in Italy
June 2022 sports events in Italy